This is a list of volcanoes in Afghanistan.

References 

Afghanistan
 
Volcanoes